Michel Strogoff is a 1956 historical adventure film directed by Carmine Gallone and starring Curd Jürgens. It is based on  1876 novel of the same title by Jules Verne. Made as a co-production between several European nations, it was shot at the Kosutnjak Studios in Belgrade using CinemaScope.. The film's sets were designed by the art directors Léon Barsacq and Vlastimir Gavrik. Jürgens also appeared in a 1961 follow-up The Triumph of Michael Strogoff.

Synopsis
In the nineteenth century Imperial Russian forces are battling against Tartar forces at the city of Irkutsk. Tsar Alexander II sends Michel Strogoff as a courier to try and reach the besieged city, and he travels disguised as a merchant along with Nadia and two war correspondents.

Cast
 Curd Jürgens as  Michel Strogoff
 Geneviève Page as Nadia
 Jacques Dacqmine as  Grand-duc
 Sylva Koscina as  Zingara
 Gérard Buhr as  Blond
 Jean Parédès as  Jolivet
 Valery Inkijinoff as  Feofar Khan
 Françoise Fabian as  Natko
 Henri Nassiet as  Ivan Ogareff
 Sylvie as  Marfa Strogoff
 Louis Arbessier as Tsar
 Michel Etcheverryas  General Krisloff
 Paul Demange as Employé du telegraphe

Reception
It was the most popular movie of the year in France. An estimated seven million spectators passed through the box office to see it in the country.

References

Bibliography
 Hayward, Susan. French Costume Drama of the 1950s: Fashioning Politics in Film. Intellect Books, 2010.
 Schiltz, Francoise. The Future Revisited: Jules Verne on Screen in 1950s America. Andrews UK Limited, 2012.

External links

1956 films
1950s historical adventure films
French historical adventure films
Italian historical adventure films
Films directed by Carmine Gallone
Films based on Michael Strogoff
Films set in Russia
Films set in the 19th century
Films scored by Norbert Glanzberg
Films shot in Serbia
1950s French-language films
1950s French films
1950s Italian films
German historical adventure films